Labeobarbus lobogenysoides is a species of ray-finned fish in the genus Labeobarbus is endemic to the Loama River in the Democratic Republic of the Congo.

References 

lobogenysoides
Taxa named by Jacques Pellegrin
Fish described in 1935